Nirthaan or Nirthan is a village in Sonipat district, Haryana, India. It is mainly inhabited by Dahiya Jats and Bairagi (Vaishnav Brahmins).

It is located about 15 km away from the city of Sonipat.

Villages in Sonipat district